The Malayan shrew (Crocidura malayana) is a species of mammal in the family Soricidae. It is endemic to Malaysia.

References

Endemic fauna of Malaysia
Mammals of Malaysia
Crocidura
Mammals described in 1911
Taxonomy articles created by Polbot